Chief Oil & Gas is a company founded in Dallas, Texas in 1994 by Trevor Rees-Jones. Its primary holdings of natural gas were developed in the core areas of the Barnett Shale in Tarrant County, Denton County and Parker County. In 1999, new technology in horizontal drilling and hydraulic fracturing along with rising gas prices made the Barnett Shale, an unconventional resource for natural gas, more economical. Chief rapidly expanded its leasehold position and drilling and production program in the Barnett Shale to become the fields second largest producer there.

After selling, in 2006, the majority of its leasehold and production assets to Devon Energy and its pipeline and midstream assets to Crosstex Energy for $2.63 billion, Chief entered the Marcellus Formation gas play in Appalachia, with its primary leasehold position in Pennsylvania, West Virginia and New York.  Chief drilled their first Marcellus Shale gas well in Lycoming County, Pennsylvania in Watson Township in the fall of 2007. The company also has a leasehold position in the Utah Thrust Belt in central Utah with development expected to begin in 2009.

Quicksilver Resources Inc., a Fort Worth-based company, purchased another portion of Chief's Barnett Shale holdings in July 2008. Quicksilver purchased natural gas producing properties in Tarrant and Denton counties from several companies including Chief Oil & Gas LLC, Hillwood Oil & Gas LP and Collins and Young LLC for $1.3 billion.

In December 2010, Chief entered into an asset purchase and sale agreement to sell certain natural gas properties in the Marcellus Shale to EXCO Holding PA, a subsidiary of EXCO Resources Inc., for approximately $459 million.  The sale assets include 15 producing wells, 11 wells waiting on completion and approximately 50,000 net acres located in Lycoming, Sullivan and Columbia counties in Pennsylvania.

In January 2022, it was announced Chesapeake Energy will acquire the company for $2,6 billion.

Technology

Chief Oil & Gas develops natural gas from shale gas plays in the United States.  Advances in the technology of 3-D seismic imaging, drilling and completion technology, including hydraulic fracturing techniques has enabled Chief to produce gas from the low permeability Barnett Shale and Marcellus Shale that otherwise would not be economically feasible.

Technology has also helped Chief reduce the size of the footprint on the environment.  The size of a drill site today has been reduced significantly compared to 50 years ago. Horizontal drilling has made a significant contribution to reducing the company's footprint on the environment. Horizontal drilling technology enables operators to reach their target site and avoid environmentally difficult areas. It also allows multiple wells to be drilled from the same pad site which not only reduces the environmental impact, but the cost to drill.

In September 2008, Chief unveiled a first of its kind drilling rig designed specifically for drilling horizontal wells in the rugged terrain of the Marcellus shale. The 1,600-horsepower rig is quieter, gives off fewer emissions, is safer to operate and can be broken down and carted off quickly.

Controversies 
In October 2010, Chief Oil & Gas donated $50,000 to then-gubernatorial candidate and eventual winner Tom Corbett, which some believe was a payoff in exchange for no severance tax and the repeal of environmental policies created to protect the environment from natural gas drilling.
In January 2011, the Chief Gathering, LLC., a subsidiary of Chief Oil & Gas, was fined $34,000 by the Department of Environmental Protection for releasing approximately 25,200 gallons of hydrostatic testing water into the Big Run watershed in August 2010 at a pipeline project in Penn Township, Lycoming County, Pennsylvania.
In the first six months of 2010, Chief Oil & Gas was cited for 78 violations by the Pennsylvania DEP, more than any other Marcellus shale driller in the state and with the highest ratio of violations at 3.5 per well.
In June 2010, a well blowout and fire at a Chief-owned site injured seven contractors in Moundsville, West Virginia, and burned for days.  No one from the emergency response crews had been given instruction on how to fight a well blowout and the burning site was found abandoned when the responders arrived.
Chief is part of an industry consortium of producers that organized the Appalachian Shale Water Conservation and Management Committee (ASWCMC) in the Spring of 2008 to address water issues long term. The ASWCMC has made a financial investment to research water recycling, treatment and minimum water quality needed for the hydraulic fracture stimulation process.

References

External links
Official website

Oil companies of the United States
Natural gas companies of the United States
Petroleum in Texas
Companies based in Dallas
Energy companies established in 1994
Non-renewable resource companies established in 1994
1994 establishments in Texas